The Casa Sindical (the "Syndical House") is a building in Madrid, Spain. It currently hosts the headquarters of the Ministry of Health of Spain.

History 
The contest guidelines for the draft project, convened by Fermín Sanz Orrio, the then national delegate of trade unions of FET y de las JONS, were published in April 1949. The project was finally entrusted ex-aequo to Francisco de Asís Cabrero and Rafael de Aburto. Finished in 1951, some dependencies were opened in July 1955, taking advantage of the celebration of the III National Congress of Workers. It was formally inaugurated by Francisco Franco on 27 October 1955.

Description 
Located in front of the Prado Museum, it features a central prismatic 16-floor brick tower, that reaches a 60-metre height. The landmark symbolically marked the acceptance of modern architecture by the Francoist regime in terms of architectural language, straying away from previous traditionalist aesthetics. It has often been linked to the works of Italian Fascist architect Giuseppe Terragni.

Notes

References

Bibliography

Links 
 
 Ministerio de Sanidad y Consumo at Fundación Arquitectura COAM webpage

Buildings and structures in Cortes neighborhood, Madrid
Office buildings in Madrid